Carrera (SS-22) is a  built for the Chilean Navy by DCNS in Cherbourg and Navantia in Cartagena, Spain.

Carrera is the second of two units, behind O'Higgins (SS-23) built to replace the old Oberon-class submarines that served in the Chilean Navy for 30 years. It is currently serving in the Submarine Force with a base port in Talcahuano.

References

Submarines of the Chilean Navy
Scorpène-class submarines
Scorpène-class submarines of the Chilean Navy